The Lewisham North by-election of 14 February 1957 was held following the death of Conservative Member of Parliament (MP) Sir Austin Hudson, 1st Baronet the previous year. In a defeat for the Conservative government, the seat was gained by the Labour Party.

Candidates
The Conservative Party chose Norman Farmer as their candidate for the seat, which had been held by the party since its creation in 1950.

The Labour Party candidate was Niall MacDermot, the son of an Irish barrister. Himself a successful lawyer, he had only joined the party the previous year after fearing that his involvement in an earlier manslaughter case would preclude any political ambitions. MacDermot's mentor within the party, Elwyn Jones, persuaded him to run for election.

Leslie Greene ran as an "independent loyalist" candidate. Although an independent she was actively supported by the right-wing pressure group the League of Empire Loyalists. Greene, the group's organising secretary, had gained notoriety the previous year when she interrupted a speech by Anthony Eden, typical of the sort of headline-grabbing stunt favoured by the group at the time.

Result of the previous general election
Results from the previous general election were:

Result of the by-election

The results of the by-election were as follows:

References

Lewisham North,1957
Lewisham North by-election
Lewisham North by-election
Lewisham North,1957